James Morris (born November 20, 1991) is a former American football linebacker who was signed as an undrafted free agent by the New England Patriots in 2014. He played college football for the University of Iowa.

Professional career

New England Patriots
Morris was signed as an undrafted free agent by the New England Patriots on May 16, 2014. He was then released on May 20, 2014. Morris was then re-signed by the New England Patriots on August 3, 2014. He was placed on injured reserve during final cuts on August 30 of that year. Morris won Super Bowl XLIX with the Patriots after they defeated the defending champion Seattle Seahawks 28-24. On September 4, 2015, Morris was waived by the Patriots.

New York Giants
On September 16, 2015, the New York Giants signed Morris to their practice squad. On October 31, 2015, the Giants announced they had waived cornerback Brandon McGee, and promoted Morris to their active roster. On November 17, 2015, Morris was waived by the Giants. On November 19, 2015, Morris was re-signed to the practice squad. On December 5, 2015, he was promoted to the active roster. On December 25, 2015, Morris was placed on injured reserve due to a quad injury. On May 9, 2016, Morris was waived by the Giants.

Dallas Cowboys
On August 2, 2016, Morris was signed as a free agent by the Dallas Cowboys. The move was intended to provide depth because of the injuries at the linebacker position. On August 30, he was placed on the injured reserve list.

References

External links
 New England Patriots bio

1991 births
Living people
People from Solon, Iowa
Players of American football from Iowa
American football linebackers
Iowa Hawkeyes football players
New England Patriots players
New York Giants players
Dallas Cowboys players